Neoteredo is a genus of bivalves belonging to the family Teredinidae.

The species of this genus are found in Southern America.

Species:
 Neoteredo reynei (Bartsch, 1920)

References

Teredinidae
Bivalve genera